Lima Central Catholic High School (LCC) is a private parochial school in Lima, Ohio, United States. It is part of the Roman Catholic Diocese of Toledo.

Ohio High School Athletic Association State Championships

 Boys Golf - 2002,2003,2005 
 Boys Baseball - 1951* 
 * Won by St. Rose High School prior to consolidation into Lima Central Catholic. St. Rose is now an elementary school only.
 Boys Basketball - 2010, 2014, 2016
 Girls Volleyball - 2007
 Boys Track & Field - 2014 
 Girls Golf - 2018, 2019

Notable alumni
Jim Lynch, football player
Thomas Lynch, United States Navy rear admiral

References

External links
 

Catholic secondary schools in Ohio
Buildings and structures in Lima, Ohio
High schools in Allen County, Ohio
Educational institutions established in 1959
1959 establishments in Ohio